Teroele  is a village in De Fryske Marren in the province of Friesland, the Netherlands. It had a population of around 20 in 2017.

History
The village was first mentioned in 1482 as Olis, and means land on water. The bell tower dates from 1723. The church was demolished in the 17th church. In 1840, it was home to 72 people.

Before 2014, Teroele was part of the Skarsterlân municipality and before 1984 it was part of Doniawerstal.

References

External links

De Fryske Marren
Populated places in Friesland